Tinker Bell and the Lost Treasure is a 2009 American computer-animated adventure film directed by Klay Hall (in his feature directorial debut) and the second installment in the Disney Fairies franchise. Produced by DisneyToon Studios, it was animated by Prana Studios, and revolves around Tinker Bell, a fairy character created by J. M. Barrie in his 1904 play Peter Pan, or The Boy Who Wouldn't Grow Up, and featured in subsequent adaptations, especially in Disney's animated works. It was released on Blu-ray and DVD by Walt Disney Studios Home Entertainment on October 27, 2009.

The film was followed by more direct-to-video films: Tinker Bell and the Great Fairy Rescue, Secret of the Wings, The Pirate Fairy and Tinker Bell and the Legend of the NeverBeast.

Plot
The nature-talent fairies are bringing Autumn to the mainland. Meanwhile, in Pixie Hollow, Tinker Bell is working on a new invention to help her friend Terence (who harbors romantic feelings for her) but is summoned to meet Queen Clarion, Fairy Mary, and the Minister of Autumn. They show her a mystical moonstone and explain that every eight years, during the Autumn revelry, a blue harvest moon appears. Its light passes through the moonstone and creates blue-colored pixie dust which rejuvenates the pixie dust tree. Tink is assigned to create a ceremonial scepter to hold the moonstone.

Tinker Bell asks Terence to be her assistant, but as work on the scepter progresses, she becomes progressively annoyed at his overeager efforts. When asked to go find something sharp, Terence brings a compass to her workshop, irritating Tink, not bothering to look inside to see the sharp arrow. She bumps the compass, causing it to roll over and crush her newly completed scepter. Tink blames and lashes out at Terence and, after he leaves, her furious antics result in the compass accidentally smashing the moonstone as well.

At the theatre, Tinker Bell learns about a magic mirror, which, according to legend, granted two of three wishes before becoming lost. After falling out with Terence over her wanting him to give her extra pixie dust, Tink sets out in a balloon, intending to use the mirror’s third and last wish to repair the moonstone.

While trying to evade a hungry bat, a green firefly named Blaze crash lands into Tinker Bell's balloon, and a reluctant Tink allows him to accompany her. As they journey on, Tink thinks she has stumbled upon the stone arch that is said to lead way to the mirror. She leaves the balloon to get a closer look and leaves Blaze to watch it. However, the balloon’s anchoring gives way and it flies off. Tink and Blaze attempt to chase it, but the harsh winds knock them down.

Tinker Bell awakens the next morning and, with the help of some friendly insects, she and Blaze are led to the real stone arch. After evading two dim-witted trolls, they find the shipwreck where the mirror is. When Tink finally discovers the mirror, Blaze’s buzzing annoys her and she unwittingly wishes for Blaze to be quiet for a minute, wasting the third wish. Tink blames Blaze for distracting her, but then realizes that her temper is what had gotten her in trouble in the first place, apologizes to Blaze, and breaks down crying, wishing that she could make up with Terence. She is then found by Terence, who has been following her after discovering her plans, even finding her lost balloon on the way. The three of them escape the ship after being chased by rats.

On the way back to Pixie Hollow, Tinker Bell fixes the scepter by assembling the mirror, pieces of the original scepter that Terence has brought, and the sharp compass arrow. The balloon lands in the middle of the revelry and Tink unveils the scepter, which has been set with fragments of the shattered moonstone and a gem from the mirror’s handle, to the horror of the assembled fairies. The mirror’s gem refracts the blue moon’s light into the individual moonstone pieces, creating an enormous amount of blue pixie dust. Overjoyed, Tinker Bell and Terence join everyone in a procession to take the blue pixie dust to the pixie dust tree.

Voice cast
The voice actors and actresses are largely the same as in the previous film. America Ferrera did not reprise her role as Fawn and was replaced by newcomer Angela Bartys.

 Mae Whitman as Tinker Bell, a tinker fairy.
 Jesse McCartney as Terence, the pixie-dust keeper.
 Jane Horrocks as Fairy Mary, the overseer of all tinker fairies.
 Lucy Liu as Silvermist, a water fairy.
 Raven-Symoné as Iridessa, a light fairy.
 Kristin Chenoweth as Rosetta, a garden fairy.
 Angela Bartys as Fawn, an animal fairy.
 Rob Paulsen as Bobble, a wispy tinker fairy with large glasses. / Grimsley, a tall troll. / Mr. Owl
 Jeff Bennett as Clank, a large tinker fairy with a booming voice. / Fairy Gary, the overseer of the pixie-dust keepers. / Leech, a short troll.
 Grey DeLisle as Lyria, a storytelling fairy. / Viola, the Queen's herald. / Narrator
 John DiMaggio as Redleaf, the Minister of Autumn.
 Eliza Pollack Zebert as Blaze, a firefly.
 Bob Bergen as Bugs / Creatures
 Roger Craig Smith as Bolt, a pixie-dust keeper. / Stone, a pixie-dust keeper.
 Allison Roth as French Fairy
 Thom Adcox-Hernandez as Flint, a pixie-dust keeper.
 Anjelica Huston as Queen Clarion, the queen of all Pixie Hollow.

Crew
 Director – Klay Hall
 Writer – Evan Spiliotopoulos

Production
Because the film takes place in the cooler weather of autumn, the costume design for Tinker Bell called for a more realistic outfit. Designers added a long-sleeve shirt, shawl, leggings and boots to her costume. Said director Klay Hall, "In the earlier films, she wears her iconic little green dress. However, it being fall and there being crispness in the air, in addition to this being an adventure movie, her dress just wouldn't work".

Music
The score to the film was composed by Joel McNeely, who scored the first Tinker Bell film. He recorded the music with an 82-piece ensemble of the Hollywood Studio Symphony and Celtic violin soloist Máiréad Nesbitt at the Sony Scoring Stage.

Gift of a Friend

"Gift of a Friend" was released as a soundtrack single on December 16, 2009. There is currently a music video for the single. It is performed by Demi Lovato and also appears on her second studio album Here We Go Again.

Soundtrack
The soundtrack was released on September 22, 2009, and contains songs from and inspired by the film. The soundtrack also contains "Fly to Your Heart" from the first film. "Gift of a Friend" by Demi Lovato was released as a promotional single of the soundtrack.

"Gift of a Friend" – Demi Lovato
"Take to the Sky" – Jordan Pruitt
"Where the Sunbeams Play" – Méav Ní Mhaolchatha
"Road to Paradise" – Jordin Sparks
"I'll Try" – Jesse McCartney
"If You Believe" – Lisa Kelly
"Magic Mirror" – Tiffany Thornton
"The Magic of a Friend" – Hayley Orrantia
"It's Love That Holds Your Hand" – Jonatha Brooke
"A Greater Treasure Than a Friend" – Savannah Outen
"Pixie Dust" – Ruby Summer
"Fly Away Home" – Alyson Stoner
"Fly to Your Heart" – Selena Gomez

Japanese singer Ayumi Hamasaki's song "You Were..." was chosen as the theme song for the Japanese-language version of the movie.

Score

Intrada Records released an album of Joel McNeely's score on February 2, 2015, through the label's co-branding arrangement with Walt Disney Records. Unlike the first movie, none of McNeely's score has been previously released.

 Tapestry
 If You Believe/Main Title – Lisa Kelly
 Pixie Dust Factory
 Where Are You Off To?
 Pixie Dust Express
 The Hall of Scepters
 Maybe I Can Help
 The Fireworks Launcher
 The Finishing Touch/I Had a Fight with Tink
 Fairy Tale Theatre – Grey DeLisle and Julie Garnyé
 Tink Sails Away
 Tink Tries for More Pixie Dust
 I'm On My Own
 Sailing Further North
 Blaze the Stowaway
 I'll Take First Watch
 The Lost Island
 Tink Finds the Arch
 Troll Bridge Toll Bridge
 The Ship That Sunk
 Searching the Ship
 They Find the Mirror of Encanta
 I Was Wrong
 Rat Attack
 I Can't Do This Without You
 Presenting the Autumn Scepter
 Our Finest Revelry Ever
 If You Believe, Part 2 – Lisa Kelly
 The Gift of a Friend – Demi Lovato
 Where the Sunbeams Play – Méav Ni Mhalchatha

Chart performance

Release
The film premiered at the United Nations Headquarters on October 25, 2009. Kiyotaka Akasaka, Under-Secretary-General for Communications and Public Information, named Tinker Bell the "honorary Ambassador of Green" to help promote environmental awareness among children.

The film was released on DVD and Blu-ray by Walt Disney Home Video in the United States on October 27, 2009. and in the United Kingdom on November 16, 2009. It debuted on the Disney Channel on November 29, 2009. In its first two months of release, DVD sales brought in about $50 million in revenue for 3.25 million units sold.

Video game

Disney Fairies: Tinker Bell and the Lost Treasure is an adventure game for the Nintendo DS. Like the previous game, the player plays as Tinker Bell in a free-roaming Pixie Hollow, using the touch screen to maneuver the character, move to other maps and play various minigames. The player must, for example, touch an arrow on the screen to move to another map or characters to speak to them. The touch screen is used in the item repair minigames as well. For example, the player must trace the pattern of a groove to clear it or rub the item to clean stains. The DS microphone is used to create wind to loosen leaves and petals or blow dust from an item being repaired. The highest rank on 'Tinker bell' is Champion of the Craft.

Different gameplay mechanics can also be acquired in-game, which require specific use of the touch screen. These include:

the ability to glow by holding the stylus directly above Tinker Bell. This can be used to reveal hidden items.
drawing a circle on-screen to perform a somersault. Used to collect falling items.
drawing a triangular shape on-screen to awaken plants throughout the game.
petting or tickling insects. Used to collect lost insects and awaken sleeping insects. Can also be used on random insects that roam about the maps. Items will be awarded.

Also present in the game is a "Friendship Meter", which serves as an indicator to measure the player's relationship with other characters. It can be filled by presenting the respective character with their favorite item, accomplishing tasks or even simply speaking to them. The meter can also be depleted, however, by not speaking to the character for extended periods of time, giving an unwanted gift or missing a repair deadline.

Features:

Create unique dresses, outfits and accessories
Mini-games, such as catching dew drops, painting ladybugs and collecting threads from sleeping silkworms
Multiplayer modes
DGamer functionality
Pixie Hollow integration

Other media
A 32-page interactive digital children's book was released by Disney Digital Books in September 2009.

Additional sequels

Four additional sequels titled Tinker Bell and the Great Fairy Rescue, Pixie Hollow Games, Secret of the Wings, and The Pirate Fairy have all been released, while one additional sequel Tinker Bell and the Legend of the NeverBeast, was released in Spring 2015.

References

External links

 
 
 
 

2009 films
2000s American animated films
2009 computer-animated films
2000s children's animated films
2000s children's fantasy films
2009 direct-to-video films
2000s English-language films
Lost Treasure
American sequel films
Disney direct-to-video animated films
DisneyToon Studios animated films
Films scored by Joel McNeely
Films set in Scotland
American animated fantasy films
Films with screenplays by Evan Spiliotopoulos
Animated films about rats
Animated films about friendship
2009 directorial debut films